Paul Peterson Clark (born 14 September 1958) is an English former professional footballer. His clubs included Southend United, Brighton & Hove Albion and Gillingham.

Career
While at Southend United, he was made player-manager during the 1986–87 season. When Paul Lambert left Colchester United three games into the 2009–10 season, Clark was brought in by caretaker manager Joe Dunne as assistant manager until Aidy Boothroyd's appointment as manager.

References

1958 births
Living people
People from South Benfleet
Sportspeople from Essex
English footballers
Association football defenders
Gillingham F.C. players
Southend United F.C. players
Brighton & Hove Albion F.C. players
Reading F.C. players
Cambridge United F.C. players
Leyton Orient F.C. players
Chelmsford City F.C. players
Billericay Town F.C. players
English Football League players
English football managers
Southend United F.C. managers
Gillingham F.C. managers